The 1912 United States presidential election in Florida was held on November 5, 1912. Voters chose six representatives, or electors to the Electoral College, who voted for president and vice president.

Background
Ever since the disfranchisement of black Americans at the beginning of the 1890s, Florida had been a one-party state ruled by the Democratic Party. Because, unlike southern states extending into the Appalachian Mountains or Ozarks, or Texas with its German settlements in the Edwards Plateau, Florida completely lacked upland or German refugee whites opposed to secession, its Republican Party between 1872 and 1888 was entirely dependent upon black votes. An illustration of the original Florida GOP’s dependence upon black votes can be seen in that, as late as the landmark court case of Smith v. Allwright, half of Florida’s registered Republicans were still black – although very few blacks in Florida had ever voted within the previous fifty-five years. Thus this disfranchisement of blacks and poor whites by a poll tax introduced in 1889 left Florida as devoid of Republican adherents as Louisiana, Mississippi or South Carolina.

The Democratic Party won every county in Florida in each election from 1892 until 1904, and all bar Calhoun County in 1908. Only once since 1897 – and then only for a single term – had a Republican served in either house of the state legislature.

Despite this disfranchisement of most of the state’s lower classes, by the 1912 election, southern Florida – settled after the Civil War – was to develop a considerable socialist movement at the beginning of the 1910s – most strongly in Tampa. Although this movement had no effect on the overall presidential result – Democrat Woodrow Wilson was to win every county with an absolute majority of votes – it did allow Socialist Eugene Debs to achieve the unique feat for an American socialist of finishing second, ahead of both factions of the splintered national Republican Party.

Results

Results by county

References

Notes

Florida
1912 Florida elections
1912